Enneasartorite is a very rare mineral with formula Tl6Pb32As70S140. It belongs to sartorite homologous series. It is related to other recently approved minerals of the sartorite series: hendekasartorite and heptasartorite. All come from Lengenbach quarry in Switzerland, which is famous for thallium sulfosalts. Enneasartorite is chemically similar to edenharterite and hutchinsonite.

References

Sulfosalt minerals
Thallium minerals
Lead minerals
Arsenic minerals
Monoclinic minerals
Minerals in space group 14